Parapercis lineopunctata, the nosestripe sandperch, is a fish species in the sandperch family, Pinguipedidae. It is found in the islands of Sumatra, Sulawesi, the Philippines, in Australia, on the Great Barrier Reef, the Solomon Islands and remote Lord Howe Island.

References

Pinguipedidae
Taxa named by John Ernest Randall
Fish described in 2003